Saughton railway station served the suburb of Saughton, Edinburgh, Scotland from 1842 to 1921 on the Edinburgh and Glasgow Railway.

History 
The station opened as Corstorphine on 21 February 1842 by the Edinburgh and Glasgow Railway. It initially had two platforms but two more were later added when the Forth Bridge opened. There were two goods yards, one to the north and one to the south. The northern one was expanded with more sidings. The station's name was changed to Saughton on 1 February 1902 and closed on 1 January 1917 but reopened on 1 February 1919 before closing permanently on 1 March 1921.

References

External links 

Disused railway stations in Edinburgh
Railway stations in Great Britain opened in 1842
Railway stations in Great Britain closed in 1917
Railway stations in Great Britain opened in 1919
Railway stations in Great Britain closed in 1921
1842 establishments in Scotland
1921 disestablishments in Scotland
Former North British Railway stations